Arnheim is an unincorporated community in Brown County, in the U.S. state of Ohio.

History
Arnheim was laid out in 1837, and named for Jacob Arn, the original owner of the town site (Arnheim meaning "Arn's home" in German). A post office was established at Arnheim in 1839, and remained in operation until 1910.

References

Unincorporated communities in Brown County, Ohio
1837 establishments in Ohio
Populated places established in 1837
Unincorporated communities in Ohio